Charles Brenton Huggins (September 22, 1901 – January 12, 1997) was a Canadian-American physician, physiologist and cancer researcher at the University of Chicago specializing in prostate cancer. He was awarded the 1966 Nobel Prize for Physiology or Medicine for discovering in 1941 that hormones could be used to control the spread of some cancers. This was the first discovery that showed that cancer could be controlled by chemicals.

Biography
Huggins was born in Halifax, Nova Scotia, Canada. He graduated from Acadia University with a BA degree in 1920. He went on to study medicine at Harvard Medical School and received his MD degree in 1924.  He served his internship and residency in general surgery with Frederick A. Coller at the University of Michigan.

Huggins established a method to measure the effect hormone changes have on prostatic function. He found out that castration or estrogen administration led to glandular atrophy, which could be reversed by re-administration of androgen. In 1941 the beneficial effect of androgen ablation on metastatic prostate cancer was realised when Huggins and Clarence Hodges treated patients by either castration or estrogen therapy. They monitored the prostate size and therapeutic efficacy by measuring serum prostatic acid phosphatase levels and concluded that androgenic activity in the body influences prostate cancer, at least with respect to serum phosphatase. Huggins was the first to use a systemic approach to treat prostate cancer.

Huggins was elected to the United States National Academy of Sciences and the American Academy of Arts and Sciences in 1949. In 1958, Huggins received the Cameron Prize for Therapeutics of the University of Edinburgh. In 1962, he was elected to the American Philosophical Society. He was awarded the Nobel Prize in Physiology or Medicine on October 13, 1966.

Huggins died on January 12, 1997, in Chicago, Illinois, aged 95. His wife died in 1983.

Notes

References

External links
 
 Prostate Cancer
 Ben May Department for Cancer Research

1901 births
1997 deaths
Acadia University alumni
American Nobel laureates
American physiologists
Canadian physiologists
Canadian people of English descent
Canadian Nobel laureates
Harvard Medical School alumni
Nobel laureates in Physiology or Medicine
People from Halifax, Nova Scotia
University of Chicago faculty
Canadian oncologists
20th-century American physicians
Recipients of the Lasker-DeBakey Clinical Medical Research Award
Recipients of the Pour le Mérite (civil class)
Members of the United States National Academy of Sciences
Canadian emigrants to the United States
Members of the American Philosophical Society